Bumble-Bee was an informal term, promoted by the editors of NZ Railfan magazine, describing a New Zealand railway locomotive livery (resulting from the combination of black and yellow in the colour scheme) found in common usage amongst the railfan community.

The livery, first introduced in May 2001 to promote level crossing safety to replace the Cato Blue livery and was initially trialed on Tranz Rail locomotive DC 4323, and over time was applied to numerous other locomotive classes up until 5 May 2004, when Toll Rail took over the rail system, and introduced the Corn-Cob livery.

The first four locomotives that were painted in the livery, including DC 4323 and DFT 7160, received the livery with the Tranz Rail "winged" logo. DC4185, DX5166 and EF30071 never received branding when they were repainted in the livery. DC4185 did not receive branding either when it was repainted, but the sloping block letters were later applied to the loco.

As of July 2020, only one DC, one DSC and three EFs still operate in this livery.

Variations

A few locomotives had been repainted in variations of this livery:
DSC 2678 was repainted in the livery, but with a red stripe running down the sides of its hoods, which are the colours of Canterbury. 
DSG 3251 was repainted in the Otago colours of blue and yellow instead of black and yellow, with "TR" block letters on the logo hood, and a bumble-bee version of the Tranz Rail winged logo on the cab. 
TR 874 was repainted in this livery, but in reverse with a black cab and yellow hoods, with a bumble-bee version of the Tranz Rail winged logo also painted on the long hood. This variation was called by many rail enthusiasts as the "Wasp" livery.
Although not an official variation, DCs 4421 and 4853 have received KiwiRail stickers on the front of the short-hood, and back of the long-hood.

Locomotives that wore/wear the Bumble Bee livery
DC class:
4012 - now in the KiwiRail Bold livery
4058 - now in the KiwiRail Bold livery
4185 - now stored at Hutt Workshops
4300 - now scrapped
4317 - now scrapped
4323 - now in the KiwiRail Bold livery
4398 - now scrapped
4421 - now stored at Hutt Workshops, Lower Hutt
4438 - now stored at Hillside Workshops
4450 - repainted in the KiwiRail Bold livery and now scrapped
4473 - now stored at Hillside Workshops
4565 - now scrapped
4726 - now in the KiwiRail Bold livery
4847 - now stored in Middleton Yard, Christchurch
4853

DF class:
7008 - now in the KiwiFruit livery
7049 - now in the KiwiRail Bold livery
7077 - now in the KiwiRail Bold livery
7145 - repainted in the KiwiRail Bold livery and is now under overhaul
7158 - now in the KiwiRail Bold livery
7160 - now in the KiwiRail Bold livery
7200 - now in the KiwiRail Bold livery
7226 - now in the KiwiRail Bold livery
7282 - now in the KiwiRail Bold livery
7295 - now in the KiwiRail Bold livery

DH class:
2822 - now in the KiwiRail Bold livery

DSC class:
2419 - now in the KiwiRail livery
2678
2746 - now in the KiwiRail livery

DSG class:
3020 - repainted in the KiwiRail livery and is now under overhaul
3114 - now in the KiwiRail livery
3236 - now in the KiwiRail livery
3251 - now in the KiwiRail livery

DSJ class:
4017 - now in the KiwiRail livery
4045 - now in the KiwiRail livery

DX class:
5039 - now in the KiwiFruit livery
5166 - now in the KiwiRail Bold livery
5195 - now in the KiwiRail Bold livery
5229 - now in the KiwiRail Bold livery
5327 - now in the KiwiRail Bold livery
5402 - now in the KiwiRail Bold livery
5419 - now in the KiwiRail Bold livery
5425 - now in theKiwiRail Bold livery
5500 - repainted in the KiwiRail Bold livery and now stored at Hutt Workshops as a chassis
5517 - now in the KiwiRail Bold livery
5520 (and as 5045) - now in the KiwiRail Bold livery

EF class:
30013
30042
30071

TR class:
724 - now preserved by the Wairarapa Railway Restoration Society
874 - now in the KiwiRail livery
908 - now in the KiwiRail livery

Gallery

See also
List of NZ railfan jargon

References 

Rail liveries of New Zealand